Anila Denaj (born 18 September 1973) is an Albanian politician who served as the country's Minister of Finance and Economy from January 2019 until her suspension in September 2021.

Early life and education
Denaj was born in Tirana and graduated from the Tirana University with a degree in Financial and Banking Management in 1995.

Career
Denaj worked at ProCredit Banks in El Salvador, Bolivia, Ecuador, Romania and Mozambique. In October 2013, she became General Director of the Albanian Ministry of Finance. She has lectured in human resources management at the Public Administration School since 2014.

Denaj was appointed General Director of the Albanian Compulsory Health Care Security Fund in October 2018. Three months later, she was appointed Minister of Finance and Economy in a cabinet reshuffle by Prime Minister Edi Rama, replacing Arben Ahmetaj. In 2020, she introduced a number of measures aiming to assist the country's economy recover from the "two severe shocks" of the 2019 Albania earthquake and the COVID-19 pandemic.

In addition to her role in government, Denaj has been a member of the World Bank Group’s (WBG) Advisory Council on Gender and Development.

Other activities
 European Bank for Reconstruction and Development (EBRD), Ex-Officio Member of the Board of Governors (since 2019)
 World Bank, Ex-Officio Member of the Board of Governors (since 2019)

Personal life
Denaj has one son.

References

Living people
1973 births
University of Tirana alumni
Government ministers of Albania
Women government ministers of Albania
Finance ministers of Albania
Female finance ministers
21st-century Albanian women politicians
21st-century Albanian politicians